Mandy Jiroux, born Amanda Michelle Jiroux, is an American singer, dancer, actor, choreographer, and DJ. She is known for co-developing The Miley and Mandy Show with Miley Cyrus, and for her dance tutorial YouTube channel.

Early and personal life 
Jiroux's interest in dance and performance began at a young age. She was dancing competitively by the age of 3, and touring with professional choreographers throughout her school years. At the age of 13, she had thoughts of moving to Los Angeles to pursue dance professionally.

Her brother is actor Garret Alan. She lives with her dog, Starfox.

Career

Choreography and backup dancing 
From 2007 to 2008, Jiroux served as a backup dancer for Miley Cyrus on her Best of Both Worlds Tour, and the two girls became friends. In 2008, they began The Miley and Mandy Show on YouTube, and their videos quickly accumulated millions of views. She has later claimed that, during this period, Jiroux taught Cyrus how to twerk.

In April 2008, director Jon Chu and dancer Adam Sevani founded the ACDC Dance Cru and challenged Cyrus and Jiroux's "M&M Cru" to a YouTube dance competition. The two crews continued to release dance videos over the following months, accumulating millions of views, and culminating in a final televised dance battle at the 2008 Teen Choice Awards.

With the Beach Girl5 
At Cyrus' suggestion, Jiroux applied to join the new all-girl group the Beach Girl5. She was accepted into the group, along with Brooke Allison, Noreen Juliano, Laura New and Dominique Domingo. Kris Jenner met with the group shortly after forming, and asked to become part of the band's management. The girls agreed. Jenner helped determine wardrobe and song choices, and included the band in several episodes of Keeping Up with the Kardashians. The group opened for Justin Bieber and Selena Gomez, and released an EP and several singles, produced by Rock Mafia, before disbanding.

Solo career 
After the Beach Girl5, Jiroux desired more creative control over her music and style. In a 2016 interview, she was quoted as saying:

Jiroux continued her YouTube presence on her own channel dedicated to breaking down popular choreography into quick lessons. These videos have amassed millions of views, and her channel has over one million subscribers. In 2014, Jiroux partnered with YouTube musicians Chester See and Kurt Schneider to release a medley music video of Zedd songs.

That same year, Jiroux DJed and performed at the Milwaukee Summerfest, in a lineup that included DJ Cassidy and Arctic Monkeys. Also in 2014, Jiroux was featured on "Tonight", a track by Fagault & Marina. The song was later remixed by DJ and EDM producer Starkillers.

In 2015, Jiroux released the single "My Forever", under VarCity Productions, which was followed by "Fade Away" the next year, under Armada Music. Both tracks were collaborations with EDM duo REEZ.

In 2016, Jiroux was sued by members of the band Blind Melon over her song "Insane", which incorporated large sections of Blind Melon's "No Rain". According to the lawsuit, Blind Melon's manager and guitarist were told by Mandy's manager that "Insane" was merely a cover of "No Rain", but upon discovering the liberties that "Insane" took with the original song, concluded that it was actually a "derivative work" under copyright law and consequently unauthorized. The lawsuit was settled between the parties the following year.

References

External links 
 
 
 The Miley and Mandy Show official YouTube channel
 Mandy Jiroux official YouTube channel

American women pop singers
American actresses
American female dancers
American women DJs
American women choreographers
American choreographers